Giorgi Koshadze (born February 9, 1996) is a Georgian rugby union player. His position is centre, and he currently plays for Rustavi Kharebi in the Georgia Championship and the Georgia national team. He was named in Georgia's squad for the 2016 November test series against Japan, Samoa and Scotland.

References

1996 births
Living people
Rugby union players from Georgia (country)
Rugby union number eights
Georgia international rugby union players